Valentin Conrart (1603 – 23 September 1675) was a French author, and as a founder of the Académie française, the first occupant of seat 2.

Biography
He was born in Paris of Calvinist parents, and was educated for business.  However, after his father's death in 1620, he began to move in literary circles, and soon acquired a reputation, though he wrote nothing for many years. He was made councillor and secretary to the king; and in 1629 his house became the resort of a group who met to talk over literary subjects, and to read and mutually criticize their works.

Cardinal Richelieu offered the society his protection, and in this way (1635) the Académie française was created. Its first meetings were held in Conrart's house.  He was unanimously elected secretary, and discharged the duties of his post for forty-three years, till his death.

Works
The most important of Conrart's written works is his Mémoires sur l'histoire de son temps published by Louis Monmerqué in 1825.

See also
 Guirlande de Julie
 Hercule Audiffret

Bibliography
R. Kerviler and Édouard de Barthélemy,  (1881);
C.B. Petitot, Mémoires relatifs à l'histoire de France, tome xlviii.;
Sainte-Beuve, Causeries du lundi (19 juillet 1858).

References

External links
 

1603 births
1675 deaths
Writers from Paris
17th-century French writers
17th-century French male writers
Members of the Académie Française
Huguenots